Tillandsia bochilensis is a species in the genus Tillandsia. This species is endemic to Mexico.

References

bochilensis
Endemic flora of Mexico